This article lists the results for the Japan national football team between 1990 and 1999.

1990

1991

1992

1993

1994

1995

1996

1997

1998

1999

See also
Japan at the Copa América

References 

Japan national football team results
1990s in Japanese sport